Adam Chance Abbs Rayner (born 28 August 1977) is an English actor. He is known for television roles including: Dominic Montgomery in Mistresses, Dr. Steve Shaw in Hawthorne, Aidan Marsh	in Hunted, Bassam "Barry" Al-Fayeed in Tyrant, and Tal-Rho in Superman & Lois. He has also appeared on stage in The Rivals (Bristol Old Vic, 2004), Romeo and Juliet (Royal Shakespeare Theatre, 2006) and Much Ado About Nothing (Novello, 2006).

Career
Rayner studied at Durham University and after graduating completed a two-year acting course at LAMDA.

He made an appearance as 'Dr. Gail' in the 2010 Christmas Special 'The Perfect Christmas' episode of the BBC sitcom Miranda alongside regulars Sally Phillips, Miranda Hart, Tom Ellis, Sarah Hadland and Patricia Hodge, and his character returned in the fourth episode of the third series, titled "Je Regret Nothing".

In November 2012, it was announced that Rayner was cast as Simon Templar in a pilot for a new television series of The Saint, based on the character. Principal photography began on Monday, 17 December 2012 in Pacific Palisades, California.  Executive producer Roger Moore was unable to sell the pilot. It was ultimately released in 2017 following Moore's death.

Rayner was cast as the lead in the FX television series, Tyrant, which ran from June 2014 to September 2016. In 2021, Rayner was cast as Morgan Edge / Tal-Rho in Superman & Lois.

Personal life
Rayner's mother is American and father is English and also holds a dual citizenship for the United Kingdom and the United States. He married actress Lucy Brown, on New Year's Eve 2015. They have a son together, Jack, born 28 December 2014, and a daughter, Annie Rose, born 11 July 2017.

Filmography

Film

Television

Theatre credits

References

External links
 
 Adam Rayner at The Saint Club's official website

1977 births
21st-century English male actors
Actors from Shropshire
American male film actors
American male stage actors
American male television actors
English emigrants to the United States
English male film actors
English male stage actors
English male television actors
Living people
Actors from Shrewsbury
Alumni of the London Academy of Music and Dramatic Art
Alumni of St Chad's College, Durham